Gerry "Fiddle" O'Connor is born in Dundalk, County Louth, Ireland. Gerry is a traditional Irish fiddle player, and founding member of bands, Skylark and La Lúgh. He tours as a solo fiddle player and performs with a variety of projects

Career
The O'Connor family has played fiddle for at least four generations with Gerry learning his music from his mother, Rose O'Connor, and also from hand-written manuscripts passed down through the family. His father Peter was a singer.

He later came under the influence of Sligo fiddler John Joe Gardiner. Gerry's performances concentrate on long forgotten tunes from his home area in the North East of Ireland, many of which were recorded on his 2004 album, Journeyman. From 2005-10 Gerry Lectured in Traditional Music Performance at  Dundalk Institute of Technology during which time he was awarded with MA by Research on the Dance Music of Oriel under the supervision of Dr Fintan Vallely.
This research was published as The Rose in The Gap The Dance Music of Oriel in 2018 by Lughnasa Music. CCE awarded Gerry the prestigious Gradam award in 2018 for his lifetime services to the traditional arts.

In addition to his solo performances and recordings, O'Connor is a founding member of three bands: Skylark (who have recorded four albums) and with Eithne Ní Uallacháin in La Lúgh (whose album Brighid's Kiss was voted album of the year in 1996 by readers of Irish Music Magazine).   He has recently released album  Oirialla with his new band featuring mostly unpublished Music and Song of South Ulster.

Gerry has also toured and recorded with the Irish Baroque Orchestra and is the compiler and publisher of “I have Travelled this Country” a book with CD ROM documenting  Cathal McConnell’s Boys of the Lough  formidable collection of traditional song. With Breton Guitarist Gilles le Bigot  This Irish / Breton duo recorded a live album In Concert in DZ (Douarananez) and have toured together each year since 2006. Together they have toured in France, Germany, Switzerland, Russia, Canada and Australia

In September 2013 Gerry joined The Irish Rovers. for their "Farewell to Roving Tours of eastern Canada and USA. He continues touring with this legendary band of 50 years and records on all their albums since 2011

Gerry is also a qualified violin maker and works as restorer and supplier of fine instruments when at home.  
He was Céilí Band Music Consultant on the film "Boys and Girls of County Clare"  (Lionsgate) 2003 worked as Fiddle Coach with Colm Meaney, Andrea Corr, Bernard Hill and Partick Bergin.

Recently Gerry has been working with Fintan Vallely on the development of "Compánach",  an audio visual intimate acoustic recital of music and song which interprets the nature, scope and quality of Irish Traditional music as described in the encyclopedia Companion to Irish Traditional Music.  A double Cd of the show has been recorded to accompany this popular touring show.

Personal life
Gerry is married to fiddle player and chartered engineer Síle Boylan. They have two young children.

Gerry was previously married to the singer Eithne Ní Uallacháin from 1978 until her death in 1999. Their eldest son, Dónal is a fiddler, producer and recording studio owner, and performs with At First Light and Ulaidh. Their daughter Siubhán is a lawyer with an international accountancy firm and is a fiddle player and singer. Their second son Feilimí is a factual television director and producer with Stirling Films and Television Productions Belfast and singer.  Gerry and Eithne's third son Finnian is a Uilleann Piper and has toured Europe and USA with various dance productions

Discography 
Active Projects

  "Last Night's Joy" 2018 (Lughnasa Music LUGCD966) 
  "Companach"  (2018) Double CD of the audio visual show.  
 Oirialla, 2011 (Lughnasa Music LUGCD965) 
 White Raven: The Place where Life Began, 2006 
 In Concert, with Gilles le Bigot, 2005 (Lughnasa Music LUGCD963)
 Jig Away the Donkey, 2011 (Lughnasa Music LUGCD964) *  
 Journeyman, 2004 (Lughnasa Music LUGCD962) 
 "Merry Merry Time of Year", 2011  (The Irish Rovers IRD1111)

With Lá Lugh
 Bilingua, 2014 (Gael Linn) 
 Senex Puer, 1998 (Sony Music Entertainment) Re-released on IML 2010
 Brighid's Kiss, 1996 (Lughnasa Music)
 Lá Lugh, 1991 (Claddagh Records) re-released 2011 on Lughnasa Music LUGCD960
 Cosa gan Bhróga, 1987( Gael Linn) released on CD 2012

With Skylark
 Raining Bicycles, 1996 (Claddagh Records)
 Light and Shade, 1992 (Claddagh Records)
 All of It, 1989 (Claddagh Records)
 Skylark, 1987 (Claddagh Records)

Publications 

 I have Travelled this Country; Songs of Cathal McConnell with DVD , 2011 (Lughnasa Music) with DVD of recordings of 123 songs 
 The Rose in the Gap , Dance Music of Oriel from the Donnellan Collection 2018 (Lughnasa Music)   177pp

Other Albums
 Musita, 1987–94, 1995 (Ribium)
 The Celts Rise Again, 1990 (Green Linnet)
 Bringing it all back Home, 1991
 The Rough Guide to Irish Music, 1996 (World Music Network)
 Tacsí, 2000 (Vertical Records)
 Rogha Scoil Samhraidh Willie Clancy, 2008 (Oidhreacht an Chláir OAC-CD003, Selected)
 Songs and People of the Sea'', 2009 (Greentrax Recordings)

References

External links
Gerry O'Connor official website
with Fintan Vallely
The Irish Rovers website
Site for the group Jig Away the Donkey with Garbrial McArdle and Martin Quinn
Vocal A Capella trio led by Kate Dineen

 Song collection of Cathal McConnel

Year of birth missing (living people)
Living people
Irish fiddlers
People from Dundalk
Musicians from County Louth
21st-century violinists